Massacre in Nicosia was a massacre committed by Ottomans during Ottoman–Venetian War (1570–1573). On 1 July 1570, Cyprus came under the rule of the Ottoman Turks. On 22 July, Piyale Pasha having captured Paphos, Limassol and Larnaca marched his army towards Nicosia and laid siege to the city. The city managed to last 40 days under siege until its fall on 9 September 1570. Approximately 20,000 Greek inhabitants died during the siege and every church, public building, and palace was looted. Nicosia had an estimated population of 21,100 before the Ottoman invasion, and based on the Ottoman census data of 1572, the population had been reduced to 1,100–1,200. The devastation of the city was so extensive that for the few years after the conquest, a number of villages in the island had a larger population than Nicosia. The main churches were converted into mosques, such as the conversion of the Saint Sophia Cathedral.

References

Cyprus history-related lists
Massacres in Cyprus
16th-century murder
Massacres committed by the Ottoman Empire